Rickey Hollow is a valley in Marion County in the U.S. state of Missouri.

Rickey Hollow has the name of the local Rickey family.

References

Valleys of Marion County, Missouri
Valleys of Missouri